Edwina Margaret Lumsden, professionally known as Fanny Lumsden, is an Australian country music singer and songwriter. Lumsden is best known for her ARIA-award winning album Fallow.

Career
Lumsden was born in Warren, New South Wales and grew up near Tallimba.

In October 2012, Lumsden released her debut EP titled Autumn Lawn under the band name Fanny Lumsden and the Thrillseekers.

Her debut album Small Town Big Shot was released in September 2015 and nominated for the ARIA Award for Best Country Album at the ARIA Music Awards of 2016. The album produced two single's "Soapbox" and "Land of Gold", which reached number 1 on The Country Music Channel and she won CMC New OZ Music artist of the Year.

In 2017, Lumsden won her first Golden Guitar for New Talent of the Year. Later that year being nominated for another three Golden Guitars.

Her second album Real Class Act was released in September 2017. The album then went on to win the 2018 Australian Independent Record (AIR) Independent Country Album and was nominated for Best Country Album at the ARIA Music Awards of 2018. Lumsden and her team recently took home a Golden Guitar for CMC Video Clip of the year two years in a row for her clips for Elastic Waistband and Real Men Dont Cry (War on pride)

Fanny and her husband Dan run their touring company called the Country Halls Tour, which is an annual tour that visits halls in regional and remote Australia.

On 13 March 2020, Lumsden released her third studio album titled Fallow. 'Fallow' went on to win the ARIA Award for Best Country Album in 2020, 5 CMAA Golden Guitar Awards (including Album of the Year) in 2021 and the AIR Award for Best Country Album.

Discography

Studio albums

EPs

Awards

AIR Awards
The Australian Independent Record Awards (commonly known informally as AIR Awards) is an annual awards night to recognise, promote and celebrate the success of Australia's Independent Music sector. Fanny Lumsden has won one award.

! 
|-
| 2018 || Real Class Act || Best Country Album ||  || 
|-
|rowspan="2"| 2021
|rowspan="2"| Fallow
| Independent Album of the Year
| 
|rowspan="3"| 
|-
| Best Independent Country Album or EP
|

APRA Awards
The APRA Awards are held in Australia and New Zealand by the Australasian Performing Right Association to recognise songwriting skills, sales and airplay performance by its members annually.

! 
|-
| 2022
| "Dig"
| Most Performed Country Song
| 
| 
|-

ARIA Awards
The ARIA Music Awards is an annual awards ceremony that recognises excellence, innovation, and achievement across all genres of Australian music. Lumsden had been nominated for three ARIA Music Awards

|-
| 2016 || Small Town Big Shot || rowspan=3| Best Country Album ||  
|-
| 2018 || Real Class Act ||  
|-
| 2020 
 || Fallow ||  
|-

Australian Music Prize
The Australian Music Prize (the AMP) is an annual award of $30,000 given to an Australian band or solo artist in recognition of the merit of an album released during the year of award. They commenced in 2005.

|-
| Australian Music Prize 2020
| Fallow
| Album of the Year
| 
|}

Australian Women in Music Awards
The Australian Women in Music Awards (AWMA) is an annual event that celebrates outstanding women in the Australian Music Industry who have made significant and lasting contributions in their chosen field. They commenced in 2018.

|-
| 2021
| Fanny Lumsden
| Live Production Touring Award
|

Country Music Awards (CMAA)
Fanny Lumsden has won seven Golden guitar awards at the Tamworth Country Music Awards of Australia

|-
| 2017 || "Land of Gold" || Qantaslink New Talent of the Year  || 
|-
| rowspan=3| 2018 || Real Class Act || Alt. Country Album of the Year  || 
|-
| herself || Female Artist of the Year || 
|-
| "Roll On" || Heritage Song of the Year || 
|-
| 2019 || "Elastic Waistband" || Video Clip of the Year  || 
|-
| 2020 || "Real Men Don't Cry (War on Pride)" || Video Clip of the Year  || 
|-
| rowspan=7| 2021 ||  Fallow || Country Album of the Year  || 
|-
| Fallow || Alt. Country Album of the Year  || 
|-
| herself for Fallow || Female Artist of the Year  || 
|-
| "Fierce" || Single of the Year  || 
|-
| "Mountain Song/This Too Shall Pass" || Video of the Year  || 
|-
| "Fierce" || APRA Song of the Year || 
|-
| "These Days" || Heritage Song of the Year  || 
|-
| rowspan="1"| 2022
| (unknown)
| (unknown)
| 
|-

National Live Music Awards
The National Live Music Awards (NLMAs) are a broad recognition of Australia's diverse live industry, celebrating the success of the Australian live scene. The awards commenced in 2016.

|-
|  2017
| Fanny Lumsden
| Live Country or Folk Act of the Year
| 
|-
| 2018
| Fanny Lumsden
| Live Country or Folk Act of the Year
| 
|-

Tamworth Songwriters Awards
The Tamworth Songwriters Association (TSA) is an annual songwriting contest for original country songs, awarded in January at the Tamworth Country Music Festival. They commenced in 1986.
 (wins only)
|-
| 2019
| "When Your Light Burns" by Chloe Styler and Fanny Lumsden
| Alt Country Song of the Year
| 
|-

References

Australian country singers
Australian women singers
Living people
Year of birth missing (living people)
ARIA Award winners